Reginald William Dunne (June 1898 – 10 August 1922) was Battalion Commandant of the London Battalion, IRA and one of two men hanged for the murder of Field Marshal Sir Henry Wilson.

Dunne, the only child of Robert and Mary Dunne, was born (as his mother had been) in Woolwich. He attended St Ignatius' College in Tottenham, North London. His father had been a British soldier and Reginald served as a British Army private in the Irish Guards who fought in the First World War.

On 22 June 1922, Dunne and Joseph O'Sullivan killed Field Marshal Sir Henry Wilson in London. Dunne managed to escape, but O'Sullivan, who had lost a leg in the First World War was captured by an angry crowd. Dunne returned to try to help O'Sullivan. He was also captured after shooting and wounding two police officers and a passerby.

On trial, Dunne addressed the jury about how in the recent Great War he had been "fighting for the principles for which this country [the UK] stood. Those principles I found as an Irishman were not applied to my own country..."

Dunne wrote a speech which he was prevented from making from the dock (reprinted in the Irish Independent, 21 July 1922). In it, he blamed Wilson for the "Orange Terror", as the Military Adviser to the Belfast Government who had raised the Ulster Special Constables. and went on to say:
We took our part in supporting the aspirations of our fellow-countrymen in the same way as we took our part in supporting the nations of the world who fought for the rights of small nationalities... The same principles for which we shed our blood on the battle-field of Europe led us to commit the act we are charged with. ... You can condemn us to death today, but you cannot deprive us of the belief that what we have done was necessary to preserve the lives and the happiness of our countrymen in Ireland. You may, by your verdict, find us guilty, but we will go to the scaffold justified by the verdict of our own consciences.

He was found guilty after three minutes. He was sentenced to death by Mr Justice Shearman. Despite a petition of 45,000 signatures, and a plea for clemency from many prominent figures at the time, including playwright George Bernard Shaw, both men were hanged for Wilson's murder at Wandsworth Prison on 10 August 1922 and buried within the prison grounds. In mid August 1929 Irish Republicans in London unveiled a plaque commemorating Dunne and O'Sullivan. In 1967, Dunne and O'Sullivan were reburied in Deans Grange Cemetery, Ireland.

References

Sources
 Field Marshal Sir Henry Wilson: A Political Soldier, Keith Jeffery, Oxford University Press, 2006, 
 Who's Who in the Irish War of Independence and Civil War 1916-1923, O'Farrell, Padraic, The Lilliput Press, Dublin, 1997, 

1922 deaths
Irish Guards soldiers
British Army personnel of World War I
Irish Republican Army (1922–1969) members
Irish nationalist assassins
Executed assassins
Executed Irish people
20th-century executions by England and Wales
People educated at St Ignatius' College, Enfield
Irish people convicted of murder
Burials at Deans Grange Cemetery
People executed by England and Wales by hanging
1898 births